Events in the year 1564 in Japan.

Incumbents
Monarch: Ogimachi

Deaths
January 4 - Hosokawa Ujitsuna (b. 1514), commander

References

 
1560s in Japan
Japan
Years of the 16th century in Japan